George Stanley Baker was the Dean of Antigua from 1943 until 1970.

Baker was educated at Codrington College and  ordained in 1926. His first post was a curacy at  St. John's Cathedral Antigua after which he held incumbencies in Anguilla and St Kitts. He then served the rest of his career at the Cathedral: from 1937 until 1943 as Sub Dean and from then until retirement as Dean.

References

Alumni of Codrington College
Deans of Antigua

20th-century Barbadian people
Year of birth missing
Year of death missing